Hypotrachyna brevidactylata is a species of foliose lichen in the family Parmeliaceae. Its specific epithet refers to its resemblance to Hypotrachyna brevispora, and the presence of laminal dactyls (hollow, nodular to cylindrical protuberances that resemble a swollen isidium, and bounded by a cortex).

References

brevidactylata
Lichen species
Lichens described in 2009
Lichens of Central America
Lichens of Bolivia
Lichens of Ecuador
Taxa named by John Alan Elix
Taxa named by Thomas Hawkes Nash III
Taxa named by Harrie Sipman